Euchromia lethe is a moth of the subfamily Arctiinae. It was described by Johan Christian Fabricius in 1775. It is found in Angola, Cameroon, the Republic of the Congo, the Democratic Republic of the Congo, Equatorial Guinea, Guinea-Bissau, Madagascar, Niger, Nigeria, Senegal, Sierra Leone, South Africa, São Tomé and Principe, the Gambia and Uganda.

The larvae feed on Ipomoea batatas.

References

 

Moths described in 1775
Euchromiina
Taxa named by Johan Christian Fabricius